The St. Louis Knights were an American soccer team based in St. Louis, Missouri. The team began in the USISL and moved to the USISL Pro League in 1995. 

The team was coached both seasons by Jim Bokern.

Year-by-year

Defunct soccer clubs in Missouri
Knights
USISL teams
Soccer clubs in Missouri
Association football clubs established in 1994
1994 establishments in Missouri
Association football clubs disestablished in 1995
1995 disestablishments in Missouri